Playing Dead is a 2013 French comedy film written and directed by Jean-Paul Salomé. The film stars François Damiens, Géraldine Nakache and Lucien Jean-Baptiste. It was screened at the Rome Film Festival.

Cast 
 François Damiens as Jean Renault  
 Géraldine Nakache as Noémie Desfontaines  
 Lucien Jean-Baptiste as Lieutenant Lamy  
 Anne Le Ny as Madame Jacky 
 Jean-Marie Winling as Michel Beauchatel 
 Kévin Azaïs as Ludo 
 Nanou Garcia as Zelda 
 Corentin Lobet as Servaz 
 Judith Henry as Caroline 
 Jean-Paul Salomé as TV journalist

Accolades 
The film received three nominations at the 5th Magritte Awards.

References

External links 
 

2013 films
2010s French-language films
Films directed by Jean-Paul Salomé
French crime comedy films
French satirical films
2010s crime comedy films
2013 comedy films
Films scored by Bruno Coulais
2010s French films